Paul Belverstone is a British journalist. He currently works for the Premier League at IMG having spent 10 years at ITV Meridian as sports correspondent.

He presented a round-up of the day's sport for the south and south east of England and appeared nightly on Meridian Tonight.

Belverstone is a fan of Tottenham Hotspur who previously worked in radio on Southern FM in Brighton and 107.7 The Wolf in Wolverhampton.

External links
ITV Meridian - Paul Belverstone at itvlocal.com

Year of birth missing (living people)
British television presenters
Living people